The 2012 National Hurling League commenced in February 2012. 34 GAA county hurling teams: 32 from Ireland (including Fingal but not Cavan), London and Warwickshire, contested it.

On 6 May Kilkenny defeated Cork in the final to win their 15th NHL title, moving them to second place in the all-time roll of honour, behind Tipperary who have won 19 Leagues.

Format
The 2012 format was originally to consist of five divisions: Divisions 1 and 2 having eight teams in each, Division 3A six, Division 3B seven, and six teams in Division 4.

However, this was controversially altered to a system of six divisions, with six teams in divisions 1A, 1B, 2A, 2B and 3A, and four in division 3B. This meant that many counties were effectively relegated to a lower division. It was agreed in October 2011 that there would no longer be an eight-team Division 1, with the top division hurling counties giving their approval to the new system.
The league settings are as follows:

Division 1A: Top three teams qualify for NHL semi-finals. Bottom two teams play a relegation playoff, with the losing team relegated.
Division 1B: Top two teams play division final, with the winner being promoted and qualifying for NHL semi-final. Bottom two teams play a relegation playoff, with the losing team relegated.
Division 2A: Top two teams play division final, with the winner being promoted. Bottom two teams play a relegation playoff, with the losing team relegated.
Division 2B: Top two teams play division final, with the winner being promoted. No relegation.
Division 3A: Top two teams play division final, but the winner is not promoted. Bottom two teams play a relegation playoff, with the losing team relegated.
Division 3B: Top two teams play division final, with the winner being promoted.

Division 1A

Division 1A

Fixtures and results

Division 1 Knockout

Top scorers

Season

Single game

Division 1B

Division 1B

Fixtures and results

Top scorers

Season

Single game

Division 2A

Division 2A

Fixtures and results

Top scorers

Season

Single game

Division 2B

Division 2B

Fixtures and results

Division 3A

Division 3A

Fixtures and results

The Monaghan team gave a walkover after a dispute with the county board, who had refused to reschedule Gaelic football club games to allow their players to rest for the final.

Division 3B

Division 3B

Fixtures and results

Broadcasting rights
Setanta Sports and TG4 provided live coverage of matches in Ireland with RTÉ providing highlights on Sunday nights. The finals were all shown live on TG4.
Setanta Sports broadcast live matches in Australia. Setanta Sports also provided coverage of matches from the National Hurling League to viewers in Asia.

References

External links
2012 National Hurling League Fixtures and Results

 
National Hurling League seasons